The Selvili Mosque (from ) also known as the Broken Mosque locally, was formerly an Ottoman-era mosque in the town of Komotini, Western Thrace, in Greece. It is no longer preserved in any form, as only its minaret survives.

Description 
Today, the only thing left of the mosque is its minaret, itself half-destroyed, and an Ottoman grave, dating to 1761 and belonging to Kayserili Suleyman Effendi. On January 7, 2019, the Management Committee of the Muslim Property of Komotini completed the registration of the mosque's 472 sq.m. plot at the Cadastral Office of Komotini.

See also 
 Islam in Greece
 List of former mosques in Greece
 Ottoman Greece

References

External links 
 

Ottoman mosques in Greece
Former mosques in Greece
Buildings and structures in Komotini
Ruins in Greece
Ottoman Thrace